Cape Tennyson is a rock cape on the north coast of Ross Island, about 25 nautical miles (46 km) southeast of Cape Bird. Discovered in February 1900 by the British Antarctic Expedition (1898–1900) under Carsten Borchgrevink, and named by him for English poet Alfred Tennyson.

Headlands of Ross Island
Alfred, Lord Tennyson